The Delvar class is a series of auxiliary ships built by the Karachi Shipyard & Engineering Works for the Islamic Republic of Iran Navy.

Design

Dimensions and machinery 
It uses two shafts, powered by two MAN G6V 23.5/33ATL diesel engines.

Sensors and processing systems 
For navigation, Delvar-class vessels rely on Decca 1226 on IJ-band.

Armament 
Delvar-class vessels are reportedly equipped with one 20 mm GAM-BO1 cannon and two 12.7 mm machine guns. The ships have been rearmed.

Ships in the class
Known ships in commission the class are:

References 

Ships built in Pakistan
Auxiliary depot ship classes
Ship classes of the Islamic Republic of Iran Navy
Auxiliary ships of the Islamic Republic of Iran Navy